The men's hammer throw event at the 2009 Asian Athletics Championships was held at the Guangdong Olympic Stadium on November 10.

Results

References
Results

2009 Asian Athletics Championships
Hammer throw at the Asian Athletics Championships